Kristie Boogert and Nathalie Tauziat were the defending champions but only Boogert competed that year with Amanda Coetzer.

Boogert and Coetzer lost in the quarterfinals to Annica Lindstedt and Caroline Schneider.

Larisa Neiland and Helena Suková won in the final 6–1, 6–0 against Meike Babel and Laurence Courtois.

Seeds
Champion seeds are indicated in bold text while text in italics indicates the round in which those seeds were eliminated.

 Larisa Neiland /  Helena Suková (champions)
 Sabine Appelmans /  Miriam Oremans (quarterfinals)
 Eva Melicharová /  Helena Vildová (semifinals)
 Kristie Boogert /  Amanda Coetzer (quarterfinals)

Draw

External links
 1997 SEAT Open Doubles Draw

1997 WTA Tour
Luxembourg Open
1997 in Luxembourgian tennis